Vila Olímpia is a train station on ViaMobilidade Line 9-Emerald, located in the district of Itaim Bibi in São Paulo.

History
The station was built by CPTM, during the "South Line Dinamization" project, opened on 23 March 2001. It is located in Vila Olímpia, next to Lift Station of Metropolitan Company of Water and Energy.

References

Railway stations opened in 2001